Gavaz may refer to:
 Gavaz, Kurdistan (گواز - Gavāz)
 Gavaz, Zanjan (گوز - Gavaz)